This is a list of French ambassadors to Israel

References
 https://web.archive.org/web/20100616102752/http://ambafrance-uk.org/Article-by-M-Jacques-Huntzinger.html
 http://ambafrance-il.org/spip.php?rubrique1

Ambassadors of France to Israel
Israel
France